Fanny Lewald (21 March 1811 – 5 August 1889) was a German novelist and essayist and a women's rights activist.

Life and career
Fanny Lewald was born at Königsberg in East Prussia in 1811 to a bourgeois, Jewish family. She was taken out of school at thirteen to learn household skills she would need as a wife. Lewald was intended to marry a young theologian at age seventeen and converted to Christianity for the marriage. However, her betrothed died before the wedding took place. She traveled in the German Confederation, France and Italy. In 1841 she published her first novel in her cousin August Lewald's periodical Europa, under the title Der Stellvertreter. In 1845, she settled in Berlin. Here, in 1854, she married the author Adolf Stahr, a cultural and art historian.

Lewald first received attention for her writing after the publication of a letter she wrote about a court trial she had attended. Lewald's cousin, August Lewald, published the letter in the Stuttgart periodical, Europa, which he edited. August then asked Fanny to write a report on the coronation of King Frederick William IV in Konigsberg in 1840. Fanny Lewald went on to become a prolific writer and publish many successful novels. Her writing often drew from her experience growing up female in a bourgeois family, advocating for better education for women and criticizing marriages of convenience.

In 1876, after Stahr's death, she moved to Dresden, where she engaged in literary work until her death on 5 August 1889.

Published works 
Fanny Lewald's published works as cited by The Political Woman in Print
Clementine (1843)
Jenny (1843)
Prinz Louis Ferdinand (1849; 2nd ed., 1859)
Das Mädchen von Hela (1860)
Von Geschlecht zu Geschlecht (8 vols, 1863–1865)
Nella (1870)
Die Erlöserin (1873)
Benvenuto (1875)
Stella (1883; English trans. by B. Marshall, 1884)

Of her writings in defense of the emancipation of women, Osterbriefe für die Frauen (1863) and Für und wider die Frauen (1870) are conspicuous. She also wrote sketches of travel. Her autobiography, Meine Lebensgeschichte (6 vols, 1861–1862), affords glimpses of the literary life of her time.

A selection of her works was published under the title Gesammelte Schriften in 12 vols (1870–1874), and separately, in English as "Recollections of 1848" and "The Education of Fanny Lewald", translated by Hanna Lewis.

References

External links

A selection of works by Lewald from the Sophie database

1811 births
1889 deaths
Writers from Königsberg
19th-century German Jews
Feminist writers
Jewish feminists
Converts to Protestantism from Judaism
German women novelists
19th-century German novelists
19th-century German women writers
Harold B. Lee Library-related rare books articles